Carlos Rawson (born 18 June 1946) is an Argentine equestrian. He competed in two events at the 1976 Summer Olympics.

References

1946 births
Living people
Argentine male equestrians
Olympic equestrians of Argentina
Equestrians at the 1976 Summer Olympics
Place of birth missing (living people)